In enzymology, a methylthioadenosine nucleosidase is an enzyme that catalyzes the chemical reaction

S-methyl-5'-thioadenosine + H2O  S-methyl-5-thio-D-ribose + adenine

Thus, the two substrates of this enzyme are S-methyl-5'-thioadenosine and H2O, whereas its two products are S-methyl-5-thio-D-ribose and adenine.

This enzyme belongs to the family of hydrolases, specifically those glycosylases that hydrolyse N-glycosyl compounds.  The systematic name of this enzyme class is S-methyl-5'-thioadenosine adeninehyrolase. Other names in common use include 5'-methylthioadenosine nucleosidase, MTA nucleosidase, MeSAdo nucleosidase, and methylthioadenosine methylthioribohydrolase.  This enzyme participates in urea cycle and metabolism of amino groups and methionine metabolism.

Structural studies

References

 

EC 3.2.2
Enzymes of known structure